The Embassy of the Republic of Indonesia in Abuja is the diplomatic mission of the Republic of Indonesia to the Federal Republic of Nigeria. The embassy is concurrently accredited to seven other surrounding countries:

 Republic of Benin
 Burkina Faso
 Republic of Ghana
 Republic of Liberia
 Republic of the Niger
 Democratic Republic of São Tomé and Príncipe
 Togolese Republic

In addition to these countries, the embassy also represents Indonesia in the Economic Community of West African States (ECOWAS).

The chancery is located at 10 Katsina Ala Crescent, in the suburbs of Abuja called Maitama. Prior to this location, the embassy was located at 4 Salt Lake Street. The current Indonesian ambassador to Nigeria, Usra Hendra Harahap, was appointed by President Joko Widodo on 21 March 2019.

See also 

 Indonesia–Nigeria relations
 List of diplomatic missions of Indonesia
 List of diplomatic missions in Nigeria

References 

Indonesia–Nigeria relations
Abuja
Indonesia